Revolutionary terror, also referred to as revolutionary terrorism or a reign of terror, refers to the institutionalized application of force to counterrevolutionaries, particularly during the French Revolution from the years 1793 to 1795 (see the Reign of Terror).  The term "Communist terrorism" has also been used to describe the revolutionary terror, from the Red Terror in the Russian Soviet Federative Socialist Republic (RSFSR) to the reign of the Khmer Rouge and others. In contrast, "reactionary terror", such as White Terror, has been used to subdue revolutions.

Origins, evolution and history 

German Social Democrat Karl Kautsky traces the origins of revolutionary terror to the Reign of Terror of the French Revolution. Vladimir Lenin considered the Jacobin use of terror as a needed virtue and accepted the label Jacobin for his Bolsheviks. However, this distinguished him from Marx.

The deterministic view of history was used by Communist regimes to justify the use of terror. Terrorism came to be used by communists, both the state and dissident groups, in both revolution and in consolidation of power. The doctrines of anarchism, Marxism, Marxism–Leninism and Maoism have all spurred dissidents who have taken to terrorism. Except for a brief period in 1848 and within the Tsarist milieu, Marx did not advocate revolutionary terror, feeling it would be counterproductive. Communist leaders used the idea that terror could serve as the force which Marx said was the "midwife of revolution" and after World War I communist groups continued to use it in attempts to overthrow governments. For Mao Zedong, terrorism was an acceptable tool.

After World War II, Marxist–Leninist groups seeking independence, like nationalists, concentrated on guerrilla warfare along with terrorism. By the late 1950s and early 1960s, there was a change from wars of national liberation to contemporary terrorism. For decades, terrorist groups tended to be closely linked to communist ideology, being the predominant category of terrorists in the 1970s and 1980s, but today they are in the minority. Their decline is attributed to the end of the Cold War and the fall of the Soviet Union.

French historian Sophie Wahnich distinguishes between the revolutionary terror of the French Revolution and modern day Islamic terrorism and the September 11 attacks:

Revolutionary terror is not terrorism. To make a moral equivalence between the Revolution's year II and September 2001 is historical and philosophical nonsense[.] [...] The violence exercised on 11 September 2001 aimed neither at equality nor liberty. Nor did the preventive war announced by the president of the United States.

Revolutionary violence in Marxism 
In his article "The Victory of the Counter-Revolution in Vienna" in the Neue Rheinische Zeitung (No. 136, 7 November 1848), Karl Marx wrote that there is only one means to shorten, simplify and concentrate the murderous death throes of the old society and the bloody birth pangs of the new, only one means—revolutionary terrorism. 

In his biography of Joseph Stalin, Edvard Radzinsky, a Russian author of popular history books, noted that Stalin wrote a nota bene—"Terror is the quickest way to new society"—beside the above passage in a book by Karl Kautsky.

Vladimir Lenin, Leon Trotsky and other leading Bolshevik ideologists viewed mass terror as a necessary weapon during the dictatorship of proletariat and the resulting class struggle. In his The Proletarian Revolution and the Renegade K. Kautsky (1918), Lenin wrote: "One cannot hide the fact that dictatorship presupposes and implies a "condition", one so disagreeable to renegades [such as Kautsky], of revolutionary violence of one class against another ... the "fundamental feature" of the concept of dictatorship of the proletariat is revolutionary violence".

The Bolsheviks engaged in a form of social determinism that was hostile to bourgeoisie and wealthier classes. Martin Latsis, one of the Soviet leaders directing the Cheka, stated his intentions for those classes who were considered reactionary and incapable of being reeducated. Latsis wrote:

We are engaged in exterminating the bourgeoisie as a class. You need not prove that this or that man acted against the interests of the Soviet power. The first thing you have to ask an arrested person is: To what class does he belong, where does he come from, what kind of education did he have, what is his occupation? These questions are to decide the fate of the accused. That is the quintessence of the Red Terror.

Similarly, in his book Terrorism and Communism (1920), Trotsky emphasized that "the historical tenacity of the bourgeoisie is colossal[.] [...] We are forced to tear off this class and chop it away. The Red Terror is a weapon used against a class that, despite being doomed to destruction, does not want to perish".

On the other hand, they opposed individual terror, which has been used earlier by the People's Will organization. According to Trotsky: "The damaging of machines by workers, for example, is terrorism in this strict sense of the word. The killing of an employer, a threat to set fire to a factory or a death threat to its owner, an assassination attempt, with revolver in hand, against a government minister—all these are terrorist acts in the full and authentic sense. However, anyone who has an idea of the true nature of international Social Democracy ought to know that it has always opposed this kind of terrorism and does so in the most irreconcilable way".

Many later Marxists, in particular Karl Kautsky, criticized Bolshevik leaders for terrorism tactics. He stated that "among the phenomena for which Bolshevism has been responsible, Terrorism, which begins with the abolition of every form of freedom of the Press, and ends in a system of wholesale execution, is certainly the most striking and the most repellent of all".

Soviet Union 

Lenin, Trotsky and other leading Bolshevik ideologists promulgated mass terror as a necessary weapon during the dictatorship of proletariat and the resulting class struggle. In his book Terrorism and Communism, Trotsky emphasized that "the historical tenacity of the bougeoisie is colossal[.] [...] We are forced to tear off this class and chop it away. The Red Terror is a weapon used against a class that, despite being doomed to destruction, does not want to perish". On the other hand, they opposed to individual terror, which has been used earlier by the People's Will. According to Trotsky: "The damaging of machines by workers, for example, is terrorism in this strict sense of the word. The killing of an employer, a threat to set fire to a factory or a death threat to its owner, an assassination attempt, with revolver in hand, against a government minister—all these are terrorist acts in the full and authentic sense. However, anyone who has an idea of the true nature of international Social Democracy ought to know that it has always opposed this kind of terrorism and does so in the most irreconcilable way".

Many later Marxists, in particular Karl Kautsky, criticized Bolshevik leaders for terrorism tactics. He stated that "among the phenomena for which Bolshevism has been responsible, Terrorism, which begins with the abolition of every form of freedom of the Press, and ends in a system of wholesale execution, is certainly the most striking and the most repellent of all". Kautsky argued that that Red Terror represented a variety of terrorism because it was indiscriminate, intended to frighten the civilian population and included taking and executing hostages. People were executed simply for who they were, not for their deeds.

This and similar types of pronouncements by Communist leaders have led many historians to conclude that despotism, violent persecution, repression and intolerance were intrinsic drives in Communist regimes.

State terror in the Soviet Union

The Great Purge refers collectively to several related campaigns of political repression and persecution in the Soviet Union orchestrated by Joseph Stalin during the 1930s, which removed all of his remaining opposition from power. It involved the purge of the Communist Party of the Soviet Union and the persecution of unaffiliated persons, both occurring within a period characterized by omnipresent police surveillance, widespread suspicion of "saboteurs", imprisonment and killings. In the Western World, this was referred to as "the Great Terror".

The Soviet collectivization of agriculture used terror against the peasants that resisted, see "Dekulakization".

China 

According to the official statistics from the Communist Party of China and the Chinese government in 1954, at least 1.3 million people were imprisoned in the Campaign to Suppress Counterrevolutionaries in 1950–1953, and 712 thousand people were executed. However, scholars and researchers have given higher estimated death tolls.

See also 
 Communist terrorism
 Direct action
 Left-wing terrorism
 Propaganda of the deed
 Revolutionary Tribunal (disambiguation)

References 

Communist terminology
Communist terrorism
French Revolution
Revolution terminology
Revolutionary tactics
Soviet phraseology
Terrorism by form